Spice Boys may refer to:

 Spice Boys (Congressmen), a group of Filipino congressmen
 Spice Boys (footballers), a group of Liverpool F.C. players from the 1990s